is a role-playing video game and sports video game for the Nintendo 3DS developed and published by Level-5. It was released on December 15, 2011 in Japan and Europe on June 13, 2014 and released on July 18, 2015 in Australia and New Zealand. There are two versions of the game, Shine and Dark, which was released in Europe as Light and Shadow. An Inazuma Eleven GO anime and manga based on the game began serialization in CoroCoro Comic, while an anime based on the game produced by OLM started airing on May 14, 2011.

The game takes place in a world where an organization called Fifth Sector rules over the world of soccer and manipulates matches as an authoritarian dictatorship based on broad-communistic values of distributing soccer and the joy of victory equally among everyone. Tenma Matsukaze (Arion Sherwind in the English dub), and his soccer club, Raimon Jr. High, attempt to lead a revolution against Fifth Sector, by going against Fifth Sector's laws and winning the Holy Road soccer tournament.

Level-5 later announced a sequel to this game entitled . The sequel stars Tenma, the protagonist of GO, and revolves around time travel.

Gameplay 
The gameplay is the same previous entries. The core gameplay involves a role-playing adventure in which the player controls Matsukaze Tenma to explore the map, recruit new players, advance the story, and engage in soccer battles. Likewise, soccer Matches and soccer battles are controlled using the touch screen, and play in the same way as all prior games. New to GO are "avatars" (fighting spirits in the dub). Avatars are mythical beings which players can summon during soccer matches/battles. A player's avatar gives them an offensive and defensive advantage, and often allow the summoner to perform unique hissatsu techniques which involve their avatar.

Plot
10 years after the FFI, an unnoticed darkness lurks behind the country; Japan and what used to be soccer has changed over the decade. Because of the victory of Inazuma Japan, soccer has become greatly popular and influential in the country, to the point that a school's worth is directly proportional to the skill of their soccer team. The weak schools are forgotten and forced to close down due to lack of public interest and applicants. Soccer in Japan is now controlled by an organization called Fifth Sector and is led by the one known as the "Holy Emperor" Ishido Shuuji. Soccer in its current state is controlled and relies on the commands of the Holy Emperor on whether a team wins or loses based on set scores. This saved schools all over the nation from closing down by balancing tournaments—but a price had to be paid: "real soccer" didn't exist.

The protagonist, Matsukaze Tenma, tries out for the Raimon soccer team and passes. But he soon realizes that soccer is not how he imagined it to be. Tenma stirs a revolutionary wind among with the members of the Raimon team, and they soon aim to free soccer from Fifth Sector so that middle school students all over Japan can finally play without Fifth Sector's orders. And the Raimon team is not alone; they discover the Resistance that aims to replace the Holy Emperor, and are also assisted by the previous main characters of the series. With every match they win in the Holy Road, Raimon wins over more schools to their cause.

Development

Reception

See also
List of Inazuma Eleven GO episodes

References

External links
Official site 

2011 video games
Association football video games
Inazuma Eleven video games
Level-5 (company) games
Nintendo 3DS games
Nintendo 3DS eShop games
Nintendo 3DS-only games
Nintendo games
Role-playing video games
Video games developed in Japan
Video games with alternative versions
Communism in fiction